Rescuing Prometheus: Four Monumental Projects That Changed the Modern World (1998) is a book by Thomas P. Hughes.  The book uses four extremely large engineering projects of the late 20th century as examples to explore how the limits of modern system engineering are stressed by real life projects.  It also traces the development of the management of large technical system development.

The book documents four massively-cooperative projects:

 Semi-Automatic Ground Environment (SAGE), a computer- and radar-based air-defense system
 the Atlas project, which produced America's first ICBM
 Boston's Central Artery/Tunnel Project, a traffic-unclogging system of highways, tunnels and bridges originally scheduled for completion in 2004
 ARPANET, an interactive computer-based information network that paved the way for the Internet

See also 
Large Technical System

References
Rescuing Prometheus: Four Monumental Projects That Changed the Modern World by Thomas P. Hughes, 2000.

1998 non-fiction books
Engineering books
Systems theory books